These players have appeared in at least one regular season or postseason game for the field

A

 Danny Abramowicz
 Kenneth Acker
 Anthony Adams
 Mike Adams
 Phillip Adams
 Chidi Ahanotu
 Brandon Aiyuk
 David Akers
 Frankie Albert
 Ben Aldridge
 Jerry Aldridge
 Kermit Alexander
 Kwon Alexander
 Larry Allen
 Nate Allen
 Otis Amey
 Gary Anderson
 Marques Anderson
 Terry Anderson
 Tim Anderson
 Shane Andrus
 Mark Anelli
 Cornelius Anthony
 Joe Arenas
 Arik Armstead
 Ray-Ray Armstrong
 Jim Asmus
 Nnamdi Asomugha
 Bill Atkins
 Dave Atkins
 James Atkins
 Dan Audick
 John Ayers

B

 David Baas
 Gene Babb
 Harry Babcock
 Ken Bahnsen
 Matt Bahr
 Billy Bajema
 Dave Baker
 Jason Baker
 Wayne Baker
 Eric Bakhtiari
 Ed Balatti
 Mike Baldassin
 Jack Baldwin
 Jon Baldwin
 Kentwan Balmer
 Cas Banaszek
 Bruno Banducci
 Tully Banta-Cain
 Michael Barber
 Roy Barker
 Kevan Barlow
 Larry Barnes
 Pat Barnes
 Oliver Barnett
 Jean Barrett
 Harris Barton
 Dick Bassi
 Arnaz Battle
 Sanjay Beach
 Alyn Beals
 Ed Beard
 Fred Beasley
 Terry Beasley
 C. J. Beathard
 Ed Beatty
 Terry Beeson
 Randy Beisler
 Bill Belk
 Blake Bell
 Shonn Bell
 Nick Bellore
 Caesar Belser
 Daved Benefield
 Guy Benjamin
 Roman Bentz
 Rex Berry
 Antoine Bethea
 Mike Bettiga
 Ed Beverly
 Desmond Bishop
 Stan Black
 Richard Blackmore
 Tony Blevins
 Ed Blount
 Forrest Blue
 Dre' Bly
 Dwaine Board
 Harry Boatswain
 Anquan Boldin
 Brian Bollinger
 Shane Bonham
 Steve Bono
 Alex Boone
 J.R. Boone
 Chris Borland
 Nick Bosa
 Bruce Bosley
 Kendrick Bourne
 Matt Bouza
 Todd Bowles
 NaVorro Bowman
 Elmo Boyd
 Greg Boyd
 Lon Boyett
 Greg Boykin
 Ed Bradley
 Dennis Bragonier
 John Brandes
 Mike Brandon
 Jeff Bregel
 Doug Brien
 Diyral Briggs
 John Bristor
 Clyde Brock
 Tramaine Brock
 Jeff Brockhaus
 John Brodie
 Jeff Brohm
 Zack Bronson
 Ahmad Brooks
 Chet Brooks
 Dennis Brown
 Hardy Brown
 Jamie Brown
 Pete Brown
 Ray Brown (born 1962)
 Ray Brown (born 1965)
 Tarell Brown
 Tony Brown
 Trent Brown
 Keith Browner
 Arland Bruce
 Gail Bruce
 Isaac Bruce
 Bob Bruer
 Jack Brumfield
 Fred Bruney
 Antonio Bryant
 Bob Bryant
 Junior Bryant
 Jeff Buckey
 Curtis Buckley
 Brentson Buckner
 DeForest Buckner
 Scott Bull
 Ken Bungarda
 Dan Bunz
 Don Burke
 Vern Burke
 Mike Burns
 Jim Burt
 Reggie Bush
 Steve Bush
 John Butler
 Nate Byham

C

 Travaris Cadet
 Mike Caldwell
 Ravin Caldwell
 Mike Calhoun
 Dean Caliguire
 Tony Calvelli
 Carter Campbell
 Marion Campbell
 Don Campora
 Al Carapella
 Brett Carolan
 Dwaine Carpenter
 Jack Carpenter
 David Carr
 Earl Carr
 Eddie Carr
 Paul Carr
 Cornellius Carradine
 Derek Carrier
 Andre Carter
 Dexter Carter
 Michael Carter
 Ken Casanega
 Bernie Casey
 Jim Cason
 Frank Cassara
 Royal Cathcart
 Sam Cathcart
 Matt Cavanaugh
 Garrett Celek
 Gordy Ceresino
 Joe Cerne
 Jeff Chandler
 Wes Chandler
 Jack Chapple
 Tony Cherry
 John Choma
 Ricky Churchman
 Don Clark
 Dwight Clark
 Greg Clark
 Mario Clark
 Mike Clark
 Monte Clark
 DeVone Claybrooks
 Anthony Clement
 Nate Clements
 Asante Cleveland
 Tony Cline
 Tony Cline
 Colin Cloherty
 Mark Cochran
 Mike Cofer
 Glen Coffee
 Dan Colchico
 Elmer Collett
 Bruce Collie
 Floyd Collier
 Tim Collier
 Glen Collins
 Greg Collins
 Ray Collins
 Darren Comeaux
 Cary Conklin
 Gerry Conlee
 Mike Connell
 Clyde Conner
 Ted Connolly
 Curtis Conway
 Chris Cook
 Toi Cook
 Bill Cooke
 Adrian Cooper
 Bill Cooper
 Chris Cooper
 Deke Cooper
 Earl Cooper
 George Cooper
 Josh Cooper
 Lou Cordileone
 Charles Cornelius
 Jose Cortez
 Dave Costa
 Blake Costanzo
 Matt Courtney
 Tom Cousineau
 Al Cowlings
 Greg Cox
 Jim Cox
 Perrish Cox
 Michael Crabtree
 Roger Craig
 Derrick Crawford
 Gabe Crecion
 Joe Cribbs
 Chuck Crist
 Marcus Cromartie
 Bobby Cross
 Randy Cross
 John David Crow
 Paul Crowe
 Odis Crowell
 Dave Cullity
 Chris Culliver
 Doug Cunningham

D

 Craig Dahl
 Harvey Dahl
 Tom Dahms
 Chris Dalman
 Clem Daniels
 Bob Daugherty
 Anthony Davis
 Chris Davis
 Eric Davis
 Jerome Davis
 Johnny Davis
 Kyle Davis
 Leonard Davis
 Mike Davis
 Sammy Davis
 Tommy Davis
 Vernon Davis
 Phil Dawson
 Floyd Dean
 Fred Dean
 Kevin Dean
 Steve DeBerg
 Derrick Deese
 Keith DeLong
 Richard Dent
 Dan Dercher
 Ty Detmer
 Jordan Devey
 Quinton Dial
 Trent Dilfer
 Al Dixon
 Anthony Dixon
 Demarcus Dobbs
 Dedrick Dodge
 Chris Doleman
 Marty Domres
 Mitch Donahue
 George Donnelly
 Leon Donohue
 Glenn Dorsey
 Ken Dorsey
 Marques Douglas
 Eddie Dove
 Harley Dow
 Mike Dowdle
 Walt Downing
 Bob Downs
 Chris Draft
 Joe Drake
 Tyronne Drakeford
 Shaun Draughn
 Chris Dressel
 Jim Druckenmiller
 Doug DuBose
 Damane Duckett
 Fred Dugan
 Maury Duncan
 Tony Dungy
 Don Durdan
 Mike Durrette

E

 Walt Easley
 Braylon Edwards
 Earl Edwards
 Marc Edwards
 Cleveland Elam
 Shane Elam
 Bruce Elia
 Bruce Ellington
 Chuck Elliott
 Lenvil Elliott
 Riki Ellison
 Art Elston
 Ben Emanuel
 Dick Enderle
 Al Endress
 John Engelberger
 Ricky Ervins
 Len Eshmont
 Patrick Estes
 Leroy Etienne
 Demetric Evans
 Ray Evans

F

 Kevin Fagan
 Jim Fahnhorst
 Keith Fahnhorst
 Chad Fann
 Dillon Farrell
 Brett Faryniarz
 John Faylor
 Nick Feher
 Ron Ferrari
 Bobby Ferrell
 Ronald Fields
 Dave Fiore
 Bill Fisk
 Terrence Flagler
 Jim Flanigan
 P. J. Fleck
 William Floyd
 Jay Foreman
 Eddie Forrest
 DeShaun Foster
 Roy Foster
 Jamal Fountaine
 Pete Franceschi
 Phil Francis
 Russ Francis
 John Frank
 Aubrayo Franklin
 Tracy Franz
 Jesse Freitas
 Jeff Fuller
 Johnny Fuller

G

 Blaine Gabbert
 Bob Gagliano
 Bob Gaiters
 Arnie Galiffa
 Ed Galigher
 Jeff Garcia
 Don Garlin
 Charlie Garner
 Scott Garnett
 Jimmy Garoppolo
 Len Garrett
 Thane Gash
 Kendall Gaskins
 Momčilo Gavrić
 Fred Gehrke
 Rick Gervais
 Thaddeus Gibson
 Lewis Gilbert
 Bryan Gilmore
 Ted Ginn Jr.
 Reggie Givens
 Tony Gladney
 Clyde Glover
 Paul Goad
 Kevin Gogan
 Dashon Goldson
 Goose Gonsoulin
 John Gonzaga
 Tavares Gooden
 Jonathan Goodwin
 Steve Gordon
 Frank Gore
 Antonio Goss
 Bruce Gossett
 Robbie Gould
 Scott Gragg
 Alan Grant
 Larry Grant
 Tim Gray
 Elvis Grbac
 Jacob Green
 Roderick Green
 Kevin Greene
 Dre Greenlaw
 Fritz Greenlee
 Terry Greer
 Garland Gregory
 Visco Grgich
 Don Griffin
 Brock Gutierrez

H

 Ron Hadley
 Clark Haggans
 Charles Haley
 Dana Hall
 Darryl Hall
 Forrest Hall
 Parker Hall
 Rhett Hall
 Travis Hall
 Windlan Hall
 Derrick Hamilton
 Merton Hanks
 Tim Hanshaw
 Joselio Hanson
 Bob Hantla
 Parys Haralson
 Cedrick Hardman
 Adrian Hardy
 Andre Hardy
 Carroll Hardy
 Ed Hardy
 Kevin Hardy
 Lem Harkey
 Derrick Harmon
 Eli Harold
 Willie Harper
 DuJuan Harris
 Joe Harris
 Kwame Harris
 Mark Harris
 Marques Harris
 Tim Harris
 Tony Harris
 Walt Harris
 Bob Harrison
 Dennis Harrison
 Kenny Harrison
 Martin Harrison
 Jeff Hart
 Tommy Hart
 John Harty
 Joe Hastings
 Tim Hauck
 Duane Hawthorne
 Bob Hayes
 Jarryd Hayne
 Harold Hays
 Matt Hazeltine
 Ronnie Heard
 Garrison Hearst
 Eric Heitmann
 Ron Heller
 Barry Helton
 Keith Henderson
 Thomas Henderson
 Steve Hendrickson
 Ed Henke
 Thomas Henley
 Bill Herchman
 Chris Hetherington
 Dave Hettema
 Dwight Hicks
 Maurice Hicks
 Jason Hill
 John Hill
 Shaun Hill
 Scott Hilton
 Stan Hindman
 Terry Hoage
 Homer Hobbs
 Nate Hobgood-Chittick
 Gerald Hodges
 Paul Hofer
 Gary Hoffman
 Mike Hogan
 Doug Hogland
 Bobby Holladay
 Hugo Hollas
 Trindon Holliday
 Rashad Holman
 Mike Holmes
 Tom Holmoe
 Pierce Holt
 Tom Holzer
 Tyrone Hopson
 Bob Horn
 Dick Horne
 Bob Hoskins
 Eddie Howard
 Clarence Howell
 Marcus Hudson
 Marty Huff
 Ernie Hughes
 Tom Hull
 Charlie Hunt
 Kendall Hunter
 Carlos Hyde

I

 Israel Ifeanyi
 John Isenbarger
 Jasen Isom
 Steve Israel
 Mike Iupati

J

 Darrell Jackson
 Jim Jackson
 Johnnie Jackson
 Randy Jackson
 Rickey Jackson
 Terry Jackson
 Wilbur Jackson
 Brandon Jacobs
 Taylor Jacobs
 LaMichael James
 Richie James
 William James
 Ricky Jean Francois
 A. J. Jenkins
 Brian Jennings
 Jonas Jennings
 Rick Jennings
 Tony Jerod-Eddie
 Travis Jervey
 Bill Jessup
 Greg Joelson
 Bill Johnson
 Bryant Johnson
 Cam Johnson
 Charles Johnson
 Charlie Johnson
 Dennis Johnson
 Derrick Johnson
 Dontae Johnson
 Eric Johnson (born 1952)
 Eric Johnson (born 1979)
 Eric Johnson
 Gary Johnson
 James Johnson
 Jimmy Johnson
 John Johnson
 John Henry Johnson
 Kermit Johnson
 Leo Johnson
 Rudy Johnson
 Sammy Johnson
 Stevie Johnson
 Walter Johnson
 Arrington Jones
 Brandon Jones
 Brent Jones
 Colin Jones
 Larry Jones
 Terry Jones Jr.
 Darin Jordan
 James Jordan
 Alex Joseph
 Ed Judie
 Bob Jury
 Kyle Juszczyk

K

 Colin Kaepernick
 Carl Kammerer
 Zak Keasey
 Jerry Keeble
 Carl Keever
 John Keith
 Louie Kelcher
 Gorden Kelley
 Todd Kelly
 Larry Kelm
 Jeff Kemp
 Matt Keneley
 Allan Kennedy
 Sam Kennedy
 Daniel Kilgore
 Jon Kilgore
 Terry Killens
 Cedric Killings
 Billy Kilmer
 Elbert Kimbrough
 Javon Kinlaw
 Terry Kirby
 Randy Kirk
 Travis Kirschke
 David Kirtman
 George Kittle
 Gary Knafelc
 Steve Knutson
 Dave Kopay
 Mark Korff
 Kyle Kosier
 Jim Kovach
 Eldred Kraemer
 Jimmy Krahl
 Kent Kramer
 Keaton Kristick
 Charlie Krueger
 Rolf Krueger
 Pete Kugler
 Fulton Kuykendall
 John Kuzman
 Ted Kwalick
 Jason Kyle

L

 Matt LaBounty
 Travis LaBoy
 Bill LaFleur
 Roland Lakes
 Fred Land
 Mel Land
 Antonio Langham
 Danny LaRose
 Bill Larson
 Jim Lash
 Bud Laughlin
 Amos Lawrence
 Manny Lawson
 Steve Lawson
 Terry LeCount
 Dwayne Ledford
 Hal Ledyard
 Amp Lee
 Andy Lee
 Dwight Lee
 Kevin Lee
 Mark Lee
 Tyrone Legette
 Ashley Lelie
 Corey Lemonier
 Jim Leonard
 Tony Leonard
 Brian Leonhardt
 Bobby Leopold
 Otis Leverette
 Chuck Levy
 Eddie Lewis
 Gary Lewis
 Jonas Lewis
 Keith Lewis
 Kevin Lewis
 Michael Lewis (born 1971)
 Michael Lewis (born 1980)
 Ron Lewis
 Kevin Lilly
 Verl Lillywhite
 Mike Lind
 Don Lisbon
 Greg Liter
 Howie Livingston
 Brandon Lloyd
 J.W. Lockett
 Marc Logan
 Tim Long
 Jim Looney
 Joe Looney
 Bill Lopasky
 Ronnie Lott
 Derek Loville
 Alex Loyd
 Bobby Luna
 Lenny Lyles
 Aaron Lynch
 Ben Lynch
 Anthony Lynn

M

 Ken MacAfee
 John Macaulay
 Dee Mackey
 George Maderos
 Mike Magac
 Norm Maloney
 Jack Manley
 Charles Mann
 Mario Manningham
 Sean Manuel
 Chris Maragos
 Ken Margerum
 Rasheed Marshall
 Bob Martin
 Derrick Martin
 Jonathan Martin
 Marcus Martin
 Saladin Martin
 Len Masini
 Lindsey Mason
 Riley Matheson
 Ned Mathews
 Al Matthews
 Clay Matthews
 Marv Matuszak
 Andy Maurer
 Brett Maxie
 Jim Maxwell
 Marcus Maxwell
 Taylor Mays
 Jason McAddley
 Ken McAlister
 Darcel McBath
 Ed McCaffrey
 Jim McCann
 Milt McColl
 Dave McCormick
 Tom McCormick
 Walt McCormick
 Colt McCoy
 L. J. McCray
 Willie McCray
 George McCullough
 Kevin McDermott
 Ramos McDonald
 Ray McDonald
 Tim McDonald
 Vance McDonald
 Hugh McElhenny
 Leon McFadden
 Kay McFarland
 Willie McGee
 Ralph McGill
 Reggie McGrew
 Mike McGruder
 Lamar McHan
 Don McIlhenny
 Guy McIntyre
 Jeff McIntyre
 Reggie McKenzie
 Scott McKillop
 Jerick McKinnon
 Billy McKoy
 Tim McKyer
 Dana McLemore
 Mark McMillian
 Clifton McNeil
 R. W. McQuarters
 John Mellekas
 John Mellus
 Dan Melville
 Jerry Mertens
 Dale Messer
 Bob Meyers
 Art Michalik
 Willie Middlebrooks
 Bob Mike
 Steve Mike-Mayer
 Doug Mikolas
 John Milem
 Matt Millen
 Brit Miller
 Bruce Miller
 Clark Miller
 Hal Miller
 Jim Miller
 Johnny Miller
 Rod Milstead
 George Mira
 Rick Mirer
 Dale Mitchell
 Kevin Mitchell
 Tom Mitchell
 Billy Mixon
 Dicky Moegle
 Ralf Mojsiejenko
 Bob Momsen
 Jim Monachino
 Wonder Monds
 Carl Monroe
 Joe Montana
 Blanchard Montgomery
 Monty Montgomery
 Nick Moody
 Brandon Moore
 Dean Moore
 Gene Moore
 Jason Moore
 Jeff Moore
 Manfred Moore
 Marlon Moore
 Sean Moran
 Joe Morgan
 Josh Morgan
 Melvin Morgan
 Mike Moroski
 Earl Morrall
 Darryl Morris
 Dennit Morris
 George Morris
 Dennis Morrison
 Dave Morton
 John Morton
 Johnnie Morton
 Frank Morze
 Randy Moss
 Raheem Mostert
 Gary Moten
 Howard Mudd
 Nick Mullens
 Rob Murphy
 Bill Musgrave
 Chip Myers

N

 Hannibal Navies
 Randy Neal
 Joe Nedney
 Renaldo Nehemiah
 Bob Nelson
 Kyle Nelson
 Tom Neville
 Jeremy Newberry
 Craig Newsome
 Calvin Nicholas
 Mark Nichols
 Jack Nix
 Tory Nixon
 Leo Nomellini
 Hank Norberg
 Moran Norris
 Jim Norton
 Ken Norton Jr.
 Ray Norton
 Frank Nunley

O

 Bart Oates
 Jim Obradovich
 Ricky Odom
 Pat O'Donahue
 Chike Okeafor
 Dave Olerich
 Melvin Oliver
 Lance Olssen
 Brian O'Neal
 Tom Orosz
 Clancy Osborne
 Kassim Osgood
 Phil Ostrowski
 J. T. O'Sullivan
 Tom Owen
 James Owens
 R. C. Owens
 Terrell Owens

P

 Jim Pace
 Lou Palatella
 Bubba Paris
 Anthony Parker
 Don Parker
 Dave Parks
 Limbo Parks
 James Parrish
 Tony Parrish
 Earle Parsons
 Tony Pashos
 Dennis Patera
 Chris Patrick
 Reno Patterson
 Quinton Patton
 Ricky Patton
 Charlie Pavlich
 Erik Pears
 Justin Peelle
 Brian Peets
 Bob Penchion
 Woody Peoples
 Joe Perry
 Scott Perry
 Julian Peterson
 Todd Peterson
 Tony Peterson
 Dante Pettis
 Lawrence Phillips
 Mel Phillips
 Cody Pickett
 Lawrence Pillers
 Ed Pine
 Bradley Pinion
 Anthony Pleasant
 Ahmed Plummer
 Bruce Plummer
 Gary Plummer
 Jim Plunkett
 Owen Pochman
 Frank Pollack
 Darryl Pollard
 Bob Poole
 Marquez Pope
 Ted Popson
 Jeff Posey
 Charley Powell
 Jim Powers
 Roell Preston
 Daryl Price
 Pierson Prioleau
 Joe Prokop
 Hal Puddy
 Craig Puki
 Mike Purcell
 Rollin Putzier

Q

 Fred Quillan
 Chuck Quilter

R

 Chilo Rachal
 Mike Raines
 Eason Ramson
 Sonny Randle
 Al Randolph
 Saleem Rasheed
 Rocky Rasley
 Tom Rathman
 Tim Rattay
 Kevin Reach
 Keith Reaser
 Jeff Reed
 Joe Reed
 Jordan Reed
 Rayshun Reed
 Albert Reese
 Archie Reese
 Bill Reid
 Eric Reid
 Bill Remington
 Dick Renfro
 Jack Reynolds
 Bruce Rhodes
 Ray Rhodes
 Jerry Rice
 Kris Richard
 Mike Richardson
 Wade Richey
 David Richie
 Elston Ridgle
 Jim Ridlon
 Preston Riley
 Bill Ring
 Steve Rivera
 Vern Roberson
 C.R. Roberts
 Larry Roberts
 Jamal Robertson
 Jimmy Robinson
 Michael Robinson
 Trenton Robinson
 Ed Robnett
 Reggie Roby
 Walt Rock
 Del Rodgers
 Carlos Rogers
 Doug Rogers
 Len Rohde
 Mark Roman
 Bill Romanowski
 Ken Roskie
 Allen Rossum
 Karl Rubke
 Leo Rucka
 Joe Rudolph
 Chris Ruhman
 Mike Rumph
 Max Runager
 Roy Ruskusky
 Damien Russell
 Sean Ryan

S

 Tino Sabuco
 Floyd Sagely
 Bob St. Clair
 Paul Salata
 Mike Salmon
 Deebo Samuel
 Deion Sanders
 Bill Sandifer
 Dan Sandifer
 Jesse Sapolu
 Tony Sardisco
 Al Satterfield
 John Saunders
 Pete Schabarum
 Johnny Schiechl
 John Schlecht
 Hank Schmidt
 Ricky Schmitt
 Larry Schreiber
 Lance Schulters
 Jim Schwantz
 Eric Scoggins
 Ben Scotti
 Kirk Scrafford
 Tom Seabron
 Paul Seal
 Richard Seigler
 Wasswa Serwanga
 Bobby Setzer
 Ed Sharkey
 Charlie Shaw
 Josh Shaw
 Todd Shell
 Jonathan Shelley
 Stan Sheriff
 Richard Sherman
 Mike Sherrard
 Billy Shields
 Hal Shoener
 Mike Shumann
 Ron Shumon
 Chuck Sieminski
 Ricky Siglar
 Sam Silas
 Ian Silberman
 Jerome Simpson
 Mike Simpson
 O. J. Simpson
 Barry Sims
 Nate Singleton
 Ron Singleton
 Emil Sitko
 Daryle Skaugstad
 Shayne Skov
 Dan Skuta
 T. J. Slaughter
 Fred Smerlas
 Justin Smiley
 Aldon Smith
 Alex Smith
 Alfonso Smith
 Artie Smith
 Charlie Smith
 Corey Smith
 Derek Smith
 Ernie Smith
 Frankie Smith
 George Smith
 Irv Smith
 J.D. Smith
 Jerry Smith
 Justin Smith
 Keith Smith
 Noland Smith
 Paul Smith
 Reggie Smith
 Torrey Smith
 Trent Smith
 Troy Smith
 Norm Snead
 Jim Sniadecki
 Adam Snyder
 Freddie Solomon
 Gordy Soltau
 Isaac Sopoaga
 Dave Sparks
 Julian Spence
 Shawntae Spencer
 Takeo Spikes
 C. J. Spillman
 Micheal Spurlock
 Steve Spurrier
 Joe Staley
 Norm Standlee
 Chad Stanley
 Matt Stanley
 Steve Stenstrom
 Jack Steptoe
 Mark Stevens
 Daleroy Stewart
 Quincy Stewart
 Monty Stickles
 Howard Stidham
 Bill Stits
 J. J. Stokes
 Tommy Stolhandske
 Ron Stone
 Jeff Stover
 Tai Streets
 Bishop Strickland
 Donald Strickland
 Frank Strong
 Jim Strong
 Vince Stroth
 Johnny Strzykalski
 Dana Stubblefield
 Danny Stubbs
 Jim Stuckey
 Nate Stupar
 Bob Sullivan
 John Sullivan
 Nick Susoeff
 Vinny Sutherland
 John Sutro
 Jason Suttle
 Brett Swain
 Justin Swift
 Wayne Swinford
 Harry Sydney

T

 Ralph Tamm
 Hamp Tanner
 Phillip Tanner
 Jaquiski Tartt
 Terry Tausch
 Terry Tautolo
 Bruce Taylor
 Curtis Taylor
 John Taylor
 Rosey Taylor
 Tony Teresa
 Aaron Thomas
 Chase Thomas
 Chris Thomas
 Chuck Thomas
 Edward Thomas
 Jimmy Thomas
 John Thomas
 Lynn Thomas
 Mark Thomas
 Pierre Thomas
 Solomon Thomas
 Tommy Thompson
 Jeremy Thornburg
 Bruce Thornton
 Rupe Thornton
 Bruce Threadgill
 Billy Tidwell
 Andrew Tiller
 Spencer Tillman
 Ken Times
 Bob Titchenal
 Y. A. Tittle
 Bob Toneff
 Wayne Trimble
 Jerry Tubbs
 Winfred Tubbs
 Bill Tucker
 B. J. Tucker
 Manu Tuiasosopo
 Will Tukuafu
 Keena Turner
 Odessa Turner
 Wendell Tyler

U

 Jeff Ulbrich
 Artie Ulmer
 Iheanyi Uwaezuoke

V

 Skip Vanderbundt
 Bob Van Doren
 Mike Varajon
 Tommy Vardell
 Ruben Vaughan
 Teddy Vaught
 Ray Ventrone
 Garin Veris
 Joe Vetrano
 Ted Vincent
 George Visger
 Jim Vollenweider

W

 Lowell Wagner
 Aaron Walker
 Adam Walker
 Darnell Walker
 Delanie Walker
 Elliott Walker
 Val Joe Walker
 Bev Wallace
 Cody Wallace
 Steve Wallace
 Wesley Walls
 Mike Walter
 Jimmie Ward
 Kevin Ware
 Fred Warner
 Terrence Warren
 Dave Washington
 Gene Washington
 Marvin Washington
 Ted Washington
 Tim Washington
 Vic Washington
 Bobby Waters
 John Watson
 Ricky Watters
 Dave Waymer
 Jed Weaver
 Jimmy Webb
 Jason Webster
 Chris Weinke
 Mike Wells
 Ray Wells
 Ray Wersching
 Joe Wesley
 Robert West
 Brian Westbrook
 Bob White
 DeAndrew White
 Brandon Whiting
 David Whitmore
 Donte Whitner
 Dave Wilcox
 Matt Wilhelm
 Michael Wilhoite
 David Wilkins
 Gabe Wilkins
 Jeff Wilkins
 Jerry Wilkinson
 Ken Willard
 Alfred Williams
 Andrew Williams
 Brandon Williams
 Chad Williams
 Dave Williams
 Delvin Williams
 Gerard Williams
 Herb Williams
 Howie Williams
 Ian Williams
 James Williams (born 1967)
 James Williams (born 1968)
 Jamie Williams
 Jimmy Williams
 Joel Williams
 Johnny Williams
 Kevin Williams
 Kyle Williams
 Madieu Williams
 Melvin Williams
 Michael Williams
 Newton Williams
 Renauld Williams
 Roy Williams
 Vince Williams
 Carlton Williamson
 Matt Willig
 Jamal Willis
 Patrick Willis
 Klaus Wilmsmeyer
 Billy Wilson
 Cedrick Wilson
 Jeff Wilson
 Jerry Wilson
 Jim Wilson
 Karl Wilson
 Mike Wilson
 Troy Wilson
 Jamie Winborn
 Bob Windsor
 Lloyd Winston
 Mitch Wishnowsky
 Pete Wismann
 Dick Witcher
 John Wittenborn
 Tom Wittum
 Johnny Woitt
 Bill Wondolowski
 Lee Woodall
 Don Woods
 Rashaun Woods
 Abe Woodson
 Rod Woodson
 John Woudenberg
 Tony Wragge
 Eric Wright
 Eric Wright
 DeShawn Wynn

Y

 Wally Yonamine
 Bryant Young
 Charle Young
 Steve Young
 Sid Youngelman
 Walt Yowarsky

Z

 Dominique Zeigler
 Joe Zelenka
 Tony Zendejas

External links
San Francisco 49ers all-time roster

San Francisco 49ers 

players